Karl Riha (born 3 June 1935, Český Krumlov, Czechoslovakia) is a German author and literary scholar.

From 1989, he published the series Vergessene Autoren der Moderne (Forgotten Authors of the Modern style), along with Marcel Beyer at the University of Siegen.

In 1996, he was awarded the Kassel Literary Prize for Grotesque Humor.

External links 
Karl Riha in: NRW Literatur im Netz

References

Living people
1935 births

People from Český Krumlov
German male writers